The Mixean languages are a primary branch of the Mixe–Zoquean language family of southern Mexico. According to Wichmann (1995), there are three divergent Mixean languages, and a Oaxacan branch that constitutes the bulk of the family:

Oluta Popoluca (Veracruz)
Sayula Popoluca (Veracruz)
Tapachultec (Chiapas, extinct)
Mixe languages (Oaxaca, several languages - including Mixe or Ayöök)

One of the languages is extinct, one is nearly extinct, and one is endangered.

Demographics
List of ISO 639-3 codes and demographic information of Mixean languages from Ethnologue (22nd edition):

Footnotes

References
 Wichmann, Søren, 1995, The Relationship among the Mixe–Zoquean Languages of Mexico. University of Utah Press. Salt Lake City. 

Indigenous languages of Mexico
Mesoamerican languages
Mixe–Zoque languages